Neil Abramson is an American artist who works in film, music video and commercials. He is known for his feature films American Son (2008), Bob Smith, U.S.A. (2005), Ringmaster (1998), Soldier Child (1998) and Without Air (1995).

Early life, education, music video & commercial work
Neil Abramson was born in Johannesburg, South Africa, in 1963. He moved with his family to Los Angeles in 1979, where he attended UCLA and Pasadena's ArtCenter College of Design. He has directed more than 300 commercials and more than 70 music videos. Some of his music video work includes Fleetwood Mac, Janet Jackson, Mark Knopfler, Dwight Yoakam, Rickie Lee Jones, Seal, UB40, Siouxsie and the Banshees, Debbie Harry and Lyle Lovett.

Feature films & Sundance 
His first feature film, Without Air debuted at the 1996 Sundance Film Festival.

His documentary Bob Smith, U.S.A. is "a look at seven of the more than 81,000 Americans named Bob Smith".

His documentary Soldier Child is a moving look at the rehabilitation of child soldiers who have escaped the Lord's Resistance Army in Northern Uganda. It was screened at The Hague, United States Congress and used by Amnesty international to raise awareness of the child soldier issue.  

His most recent feature film, American Son, stars Nick Cannon and competed in the Dramatic Competition at the 2008 Sundance Film Festival.

References

External links
neilabramson.com

Abramson on Facebook

Living people
1963 births
American filmmakers
People from Johannesburg